In formal semantics and philosophy of language, a meaning postulate is a way of stipulating a relationship between the meanings of two or more words. They were introduced by Rudolf Carnap as a way of approaching the analytic/synthetic distinction. Subsequently, Richard Montague made heavy use of meaning postulates in the development of Montague grammar, and they have features prominently in formal semantics following in Montague's footsteps.

Examples 
Meaning Postulate is a formula to express an aspect of the sense of a predicate. The formula is expressed with - so-called - connectives.
The used connectives are:
   paraphrase ≡ "if and only if"
   entailment → "if"
   binary antonomy ~ "not"

Following examples will simplify this:

1. "If and only if X is a man, then X is a human being." In meaning postulate this would look like this:
   x MAN ≡ x HUMAN BEING

2. "If X is a girl, then X is female." In meaning postulate this would look like this:
   x GIRL → x FEMALE

3. "X is not awake, therefore X is asleep." In meaning postulate this would look like this:
   x ASLEEP → ~x AWAKE

See also
 List of logic symbols

References

Semantics